The IFA G5 is an East German three-axle truck produced by IFA from 1952 to 1964.

History
The IFA G5 series was produced in the VEB Kraftfahrzeugwerk "Ernst Grube", Werdau. The plant was part of the IFA combine and succeeded the Schumann works in Werdau. The development of the truck began during World War II in the Vogtland Maschinenfabrik AG (Vomag). Although the Soviet occupation forces completely dissolved Vomag shortly after the end of the war, further development was carried out at Auto Union and Horch. In the Eastern bloc, the G5 series competed against the Soviet ZIS-151 lorry.

Technical description

The G5 is a three-axle lorry with rear wheel drive (6×4) and switchable front wheel drive (6×6). It has no central differential, which means that turning on front-wheel drive will send different amounts of torque to the front an rear axles; there is no option to send the same torque to each axle, therefore, the all-wheel drive system is not suited for on-road driving. The cab was manufactured in several different versions, such as a closed cab, crew cab, cab with soft top, and a cab with fold-down windscreen. The G5 series and H6 series, which were built in Werdau simultaneously, share several components.

The G5 was available in different versions, such as dump truck, crane truck, box body lorry, tarpaulin lorry, tanker, water cannon, and fire engine.

Users

The main customers for these trucks were the Alert police, National People's Army (NVA), and the People's Police. Vehicles of Combat Groups of the Working Class were used as water cannons on 13 August 1961, during the construction of the Berlin Wall. Despite low demand, the number of G5 built was not sufficient to fulfill it. Decommissioned NVA G5s were later used in agricultural production cooperatives (LPG), as Minol fuel tankers, and as fire engines (TLF 15) with crew cabin.

Successor
There were two G5 generations, the G5/1, and the G5/2.

A successor to the G5 series was developed in the late 1950s. This so-called G5/3 had a  V8 diesel engine displacing 12.5 litres, single tyres rather than twin tyres, and a tyre pressure control system. In total, 4 prototypes and 2 pre-series production models were built in 1958/59 and 1961. Further development was cancelled in favour of the new IFA W50. It is said that reasons for abandoning the G5 series were the economic situation in East Germany, but also its high complexity (engine and tyres), low demand, and the necessity to upgrade IFA's Werdau plant for the G5/3's series production.

Gallery

Bibliography
 Christian Suhr: 
 G5 – Der Dreiachser aus Werdau/G5 - The six-wheeler from Werdau, Reichenbach / V. Halle / S. 2007,  .
 Nutzfahrzeuge aus Werdau/Trucks from Werdau, Klaus Rabe, Willich 2003.  .
 Günther Wappler: Geschichte des Zwickauer und Werdauer Nutzfahrzeugbaues/History of Zwickau and Werdauer Trucks, Verlag Bergstraße, Aue 2002.
 Hartmut Frank Hunter: IFA-Hauber aus Zwickau und Werdau (Feuerwehrarchiv)/IFA Hauber from Zwickau and Werdau (Fire Archive) Verlag Technik, Berlin 1999.  .

References

External links

 G5-Modelle bei der KVP/NVA/G5 models in the Alert Police/NVA
 Wasserwerfer G5 SK-2/Water cannons G5 SK-2
 Einsatzspektrum des G5/Range of applications G5
 Weitere Prototypen aus Werdau/More prototypes from Werdau
 UK-based official Wartburg, Trabant and IFA owners' club

Military of East Germany
Military trucks of Germany
Riot control equipment
IFA vehicles
Vehicles introduced in 1952